Rakhshan Division is an administrative division of Balochistan Province, Pakistan.

In 2015, the Balochistan Assembly unanimously passed a resolution calling upon the provincial government to establish a new division comprising the districts of Nushki, Chagai, Kharan and Washuk, which were parts of Quetta and Kalat. District KHARAN is the Divisional Headquarter of Rakhshan Division. 500 acres of state land has also been allotted for Rakhshan Division at Kharan. And area is situated within the limits of Kharan Town.

Rakhshan division has been notified as Division on 17 May 2017. One the same day another notification has also been issued separately of Tehsil Sar Kharan's Upgradation into Sub Division Sar Kharan with headquarter at Miskan-e-Kalat, District Kharan.

Districts 
It contains the following districts:
 Chagai District
 Washuk District
 Nushki District
 Kharan District

References 

Divisions of Balochistan